Gregoor van Dijk (born 16 November 1981) is a Dutch retired footballer who played as a midfielder.

Club career
Born in Groningen, Van Dijk played for FC Groningen (1998–2000) and Roda JC (2000–2006) before moving to FC Utrecht in the summer of 2006. He signed in July 2010 for Cypriot club AEK Larnaca. A tough-tackling midfielder, Van Dijk received a record 7th red card when skippering Utrecht against De Graafschap in April 2008. His record was equaled by SC Heerenveen midfielder Joey van den Berg in March 2016.

Now he is coach of Initiates of MTBA in Portugal and Padbol player and promoter.

Personal life
He is the son of former footballer and coach Jan van Dijk. His brother Dominique also played professional football.

References

External links
Profile at Voetbal International

1981 births
Living people
Footballers from Groningen (city)
Association football midfielders
Dutch footballers
Netherlands youth international footballers
FC Groningen players
Roda JC Kerkrade players
FC Utrecht players
AEK Larnaca FC players
Eredivisie players
Cypriot First Division players
Dutch expatriate footballers
Expatriate footballers in Cyprus
Dutch expatriate sportspeople in Cyprus